The 1899 Massachusetts Aggies football team represented Massachusetts Agricultural College in the 1899 college football season. The team was coached by Fred W. Murphy and played its home games at Alumni Field in Amherst, Massachusetts. The 1899 season was Brown's first as head coach of the Aggies. Massachusetts finished the season with a record of 7–3.

Schedule

References

Massachusetts
UMass Minutemen football seasons
Massachusetts Aggies football